German Swiss International School Accra (GSIS-Accra or ) is a German-Swiss international school in Accra, Ghana. It serves elementary and junior high school levels.

History
In 1966, the RMS Swiss School, meaning Ramseyer Memorial opened in Accra with two teachers and 23 students. The school became jointly sponsored by Germany and Switzerland and uses a bilingual German–English programme.

Demographics
As of 2007, almost all of the colored children came from mixed families, and only one student was 100% Ghanaian.

In 2009, the school had 75 students.

As of 2013, the school had 90 students originating from 13 countries in years nursery through 10 (age 15), and 15 teachers.

See also

 Education in Ghana
 List of schools in Ghana

References

Further reading
 "Deutsche Schule Accra empfängt Botschafter und erhält PASCH-Plakette." Federal Office of Administration. 21 February 2014. 
 Schweizerschule Akkra / RMS Swiss School Accra - EAD, Swiss National Library

External links
  , the school's official website
 German Swiss International School English site (Archive)

1966 establishments in Ghana
Educational institutions established in 1966
Elementary and primary schools in Ghana
German international schools in Africa
International schools in Ghana
Schools in Accra
Swiss international schools
High schools and secondary schools in Ghana
International high schools